The O2 Wireless Box is a wireless residential gateway router distributed by O2. The latest version is based on the 802.11n standard and also supports 802.11g and 802.11b devices. The device connects to the Internet using either an ADSL2+ or ADSL connection.

Features 
The O2 Wireless Box is a wireless residential gateway router. It supports wireless internet access through 802.11n, 802.11g and 802.11b.

Comparison 
The original O2 Wireless Box (available to new O2 customers from 2006, now discontinued) was a rebadged Thomson SpeedTouch 780WL.  

The O2 Wireless Box II (available to new O2 customers from 2008) is a rebadged Thomson SpeedTouch TG585v7, and supports Interface type 802.11b/g. It supports 13 channels (Europe Region).  It supports WEP and WPA-PSK encryption. Unlike the original Thomson TG585v7, it does not allow changing the ADSL username and password, so it cannot be used to connect to any other service provider.

The O2 Wireless Box IV (available to new "O2 Premium" customers during 2010) is a rebadged Thomson SpeedTouch TG587nv2, which has additional support for 802.11n, dual antennas, and also has two USB ports for connection to an external USB hard disk for sharing of files direct to the wifi or Ethernet network, or printer sharing.

The O2 Wireless Box V (the new "standard" router) is a rebadged Thomson SpeedTouch TG582n. It has 802.11n support, internal antenna, and one USB port.

References

External links 
 

Routers (computing)
Wireless box